Zhengzhou–Jiaozuo intercity railway, or Zhengjiao intercity railway, is regional higher-speed railway radiating out of Zhengzhou, the capital of Henan province, linking Zhengzhou with the city of Jiaozuo. Construction was started on December 29, 2009, and was completed by April 5, 2015. Testing commenced in May 2015 before being officially opened on June 26, 2015. Total journey time between the two termini is 40 minutes. It was jointly funded by the Henan Provincial Government and the now defunct Ministry of Railways. The fastest trains from Zhengzhou to Jiaozuo complete the journey in 34 minutes.

At its northern terminus, Jiaozuo, some trains continue into the Taiyuan–Jiaozuo high-speed railway which opened in December 2020. Some regional trains from Jiaozuo through operate to Zhengzhou Xinzheng Airport via the Zhengji ICR or to Kaifeng via the Zhengkai ICR.

Stations

References

High-speed railway lines in China
Standard gauge railways in China
Rail transport in Henan
Transport in Zhengzhou
Jiaozuo
Railway lines opened in 2015